Splicing factor, arginine/serine-rich 11 is a protein that in humans is encoded by the SFRS11 gene.

This gene encodes 54-kD nuclear protein that contains an arginine/serine-rich region similar to segments found in pre-mRNA splicing factors. Although the function of this protein is not yet known, structure and immunolocalization data suggest that it may play a role in pre-mRNA processing.

Interactions
SFRS11 has been shown to interact with U2AF2.

References

Further reading